Alkalihalobacillus lindianensis is a Gram-positive, alkaliphilic, rod-shaped, endospore-forming and halotolerant bacterium from the genus of Alkalihalobacillus.

References

Bacillaceae
Bacteria described in 2016